Aleksandar Ristić (born 28 June 1944) is a Bosnian-Herzegovinian football manager and a former player.

Playing career

Club
Ristić was born in Sarajevo, Yugoslavia. During his playing career he played for the Yugoslav clubs FK Velež Mostar, HNK Hajduk Split, FK Sarajevo and German Bundesliga club Eintracht Braunschweig. While playing with Hajduk Split he won the 1967 Yugoslav Cup.

Managerial career
In 1977, Ristić started his career as manager at Eintracht Braunschweig, where he worked as a youth coach. In 1980, he joined the staff of Hamburger SV. There he started as assistant of Manager Branko Zebec, in 1981 he was caretaker for half a year, until Ernst Happel became manager, and he was again only his assistant. Between 1983 and 1985 he worked almost two years in Braunschweig, where he started his career in Germany. 
In 1987, he started in Düsseldorf for three and a half years, in January 1991 he went to Schalke 04, but in summer 1992 he re-changed to Fortuna Düsseldorf for another four years. There he was called "King Aleks" for his long-term workplace. His third manager job at Düsseldorf ran from summer 2000 till the end of the year when he again was dismissed for lack of success.

Between 1998 and 2003, Ristić managed Rot-Weiß Oberhausen (except the late summer 2000 in Düsseldorf). In 2004, he got a manager position at Union Berlin, but he stayed there just a few months, because his team was relegated to the third league.

After a pause, he returned to work in 2007 for just one year at KFC Uerdingen 05 in the German Oberliga Nordrhein. He cancelled his contract in March 2008.

Personal life
Ristić lives in Dubrovnik.

References

1944 births
Living people
Footballers from Sarajevo
Association football wingers
Yugoslav footballers
FK Sarajevo players
HNK Hajduk Split players
FK Velež Mostar players
Eintracht Braunschweig players
Yugoslav First League players
Bundesliga players
Yugoslav expatriate footballers
Expatriate footballers in Germany
Yugoslav expatriate sportspeople in Germany
Yugoslav football managers
Bosnia and Herzegovina football managers
Hamburger SV managers
Eintracht Braunschweig managers
Fortuna Düsseldorf managers
FC Schalke 04 managers
Rot-Weiß Oberhausen managers
1. FC Union Berlin managers
KFC Uerdingen 05 managers
Bundesliga managers
2. Bundesliga managers
Yugoslav expatriate football managers
Bosnia and Herzegovina expatriate football managers
Expatriate football managers in Germany
Bosnia and Herzegovina expatriate sportspeople in Germany
Eintracht Braunschweig non-playing staff